Taita is a Bantu language spoken in the Taita Hills of Kenya. It is closely related to the Chaga languages of Kenya and Tanzania. The Saghala (Northern Sagala, Sagalla) variety is distinct enough to be considered a language separate from the Daw'ida and Kasigau dialects.

Daw'ida and Saghala contain loanwords from two different South Cushitic languages, called Taita Cushitic, which are now extinct. It is likely that the Cushitic speakers were assimilated fairly recently, since lateral obstruents in the loanwords were still pronounced as such within living memory. However, those consonants have now been replaced by Bantu sounds.

The Taveta language was mistaken for Daw'ida by Jouni Maho in his (2009) classification of Bantu languages. However, it's a distinct language, lexically and grammatically closest to Chasu (Pare).

References

 
Northeast Bantu languages
Languages of Kenya